Numbers is the seventh studio album by funk band Rufus, released on the ABC Records label in 1979. It was the band's first album without Chaka Khan on lead vocals. Instead, band members Tony Maiden and David "Hawk" Wolinski shared lead vocal duties, with additional female leads by Helen Lowe and Maxayne.  The album reached #15 on Billboards R&B Albums chart, #81 on Pop and included the single release "Keep It Together (Declaration of Love)" (US R&B #16).

Khan returned to the band for the recording of the following album Masterjam, produced by Quincy Jones.

Numbers would be Rufus' final album on ABC Records. The label would be purchased and subsequently dissolved by MCA Records, and the band transferred to its roster.

Numbers also marked the debut of drummer John "J.R." Robinson to the lineup.  He would remain Rufus's drummer for the rest of their run.

Track listing

Personnel
Tony Maiden – guitar, lead vocals on "Ain't Nobody Like You", "Keep It Together (Declaration of Love)", "Bet My Dreams", "Pleasure Dome", and "Life in the City", background vocals, clavinet
Kevin Murphy – keyboards
Bobby Watson – bass, guitar, clavinet
John Robinson – drums, percussion 
David "Hawk" Wolinski – keyboards, lead vocals on "You're to Blame", "Don't You Sit Alone" and "Are We?", background vocals, guitar
Rufus – lead vocals on "Dancin' Mood"
Everett Bryson – percussion
Richard Mikuls – guitar 
Truman Thomas – piano on "Keep It Together (Declaration of Love)" 
Chuck "The German" Brooke – tenor saxophone, flute
John "Iron Lips" Erwin – trombone
Bob "The Professor" Greve – baritone saxophone, flute
Dave Grover – trumpet, slide trumpet, trombone
Bill Lamb – trumpet, slide trumpet, trombone, bass trombone
Helen Lowe – lead vocals on "Ain't Nobody Like You", background vocals
Lalomie Washburn – background vocals 
Maxayne – lead vocals on "Are We?", background vocals 
Freddie Hubbard – trumpet on "Bet My Dreams"
Harvey Mason – drums on "Pleasure Dome"

Production
Rufus – producer, mixing
Roy Halee – producer, engineer, mixing
Thom Wilson – engineer
Allen Zentz – audio mastering
Ernie Freeman – string arrangements and conductor

ChartsAlbumSingles'''

References

External linksNumbers at Discogs

1979 albums
Rufus (band) albums
Albums arranged by Ernie Freeman
Albums produced by Roy Halee
ABC Records albums